The Journal of Clinical Anesthesia is a peer-reviewed medical journal covering a variety of topics in anesthesiology. It was established in 1988 and is published eight times per year by Elsevier. It is the official journal of the American Association of Clinical Directors, the Society for Airway Management, and the Orthopedic Anesthesia Pain Rehabilitation Society. The editor-in-chief is Alparslan Turan, MD (Cleveland Clinic). According to the Journal Citation Reports, the journal has a 2019 impact factor of 6.039.

References

External links
 

Anesthesiology and palliative medicine journals
English-language journals
Publications established in 1988
Elsevier academic journals
8 times per year journals